Rajanala is an Indian surname. Notable people with the surname include:

 Rajanala Kaleswara Rao (1925–1998), Telugu film actor
 Rajanala Nageswara Rao (1928–1959), Telugu actor

Indian surnames